Arthur Vernon Weaver Jr. (April 16, 1922 – December 28, 2010) was the United States Ambassador to the European Union. He was nominated by President Bill Clinton and confirmed by the United States Senate on July 16, 1996.

Weaver also served as the Administrator for the U.S. Small Business Administration from 1977 to 1981. He was nominated by President Jimmy Carter.

Education and military career
Weaver attended the University of Florida, and then transferred to the United States Naval Academy and graduated in 1946. He would go on serve in the Navy from 1946 to 1953.

References

External links
About Arthur Vernon Weaver

|-

1922 births
2010 deaths
Administrators of the Small Business Administration
Ambassadors of the United States to the European Union
People from Miami
University of Florida alumni
United States Naval Academy alumni
20th-century American diplomats